Polokwane Game Reserve, is situated near Polokwane in the Limpopo, province of South Africa, and is one of the largest municipal Game Reserves in the country.

See also 
 Protected areas of South Africa

References

Nature reserves in South Africa